is a former professional Japanese tennis player.

Her career-high singles rank is No. 425, which she reached in June 2004. Her high doubles ranking is world No. 185, which she achieved in September 2005. Arai retired from professional tour 2010.

ITF Circuit finals

Singles: 3 (0–3)

Doubles: 47 (27–20)

References

External links
 
 
 Maki Arai at CBS SportsLine.com

Japanese female tennis players
People from Tachikawa
Sportspeople from Tokyo
1982 births
Living people
20th-century Japanese women
21st-century Japanese women